"Home" is a single by British singer-songwriter Gabrielle Aplin. It was released as the fourth single from her debut studio album English Rain (2013). The song was released in the United Kingdom as a digital download on 14 July 2013 through Parlophone. The song peaked at number 48 on the UK Singles Chart.

Music video
A music video to accompany the release of "Home" was first released onto YouTube on 9 June 2013 at a total length of four minutes and twenty-five seconds. The song was featured on the trailer for the Academy Award-nominated drama film Brooklyn.

Track listing

Charts

Certifications

Release history

References

2013 singles
Gabrielle Aplin songs
2013 songs
Folk ballads
Songs written by Nick Atkinson
Parlophone singles
Songs written by Gabrielle Aplin